Braian Emanuel Lluy (born 25 April 1989) is an Argentine professional footballer who plays as a right-back for Super League Greece 2 club Apollon Smyrnis.

Career
Lluy came through the Racing Club youth development system to make his debut in the Avellaneda derby aged 19. He came on as a second-half substitute on 21 February 2009 in the 2-0 away defeat to Independiente. He made his first start for the club on 4 April 2009 in a 1-0 home win against River Plate. During the Apertura 2009 he featured in the majority of the club's games. On August 24, 2013 Lluy signed with Greek side Asteras Tripoli a two years' contract.

References

External links
 
 
 Brian Emanuel Lluy – Argentine Primera statistics at Fútbol XXI  
 

1989 births
Living people
People from Pergamino
Argentine footballers
Association football defenders
Argentine Primera División players
Torneo Federal A players
Primera Nacional players
Super League Greece players
Asteras Tripolis F.C. players
Racing Club de Avellaneda footballers
Quilmes Atlético Club footballers
Boca Unidos footballers
Club Atlético Platense footballers
Argentine expatriate footballers
Expatriate footballers in Greece
Argentine expatriate sportspeople in Greece
Sportspeople from Buenos Aires Province